Sam Hill House is a historic, privately owned home located in Seattle, Washington's Capitol Hill neighborhood. The property forms part of the city-designated Harvard-Belmont Landmark District.

The concrete building was constructed between 1909 and 1910 by railroad magnate Sam Hill in preparation for a planned visit to Seattle by a member of the Belgian royal family. Following Hill's 1931 death, the home remained vacant until its purchase in 1937 by Theodore and Guendolen Plestcheeff. Guendolen Plestcheeff, a notable local preservationist,  remained resident at the property until her death in 1994.

In 2016 the home went on sale for $15 million.

References

Houses in Seattle
1900s architecture in the United States